Commonly known as Casa Chorizo, Casa Patio, or formally as Standard House (Casa Standard) it is a type of house that was massively built in the late 19th and early 20th century, predominantly in Montevideo, Buenos Aires and Rosario, but to a lesser extent in many other towns and cities of Argentina and Uruguay.

The house is characterized by a rectangular facade typically with three windows and a door of similar style and proportions, usually highly ornamented. It has a typical rectangular layout and on one of its long sides it has an inside patio. The square rooms are centered around this patio, without an internal hallway. To access another room, either one must walk through the patio to go to another room or walk through the doors between two adjacent rooms.

History 
From 1850 large immigration waves from middle-class families leaving mainly Italy and Spain moved to the Río de la Plata region and increased the population significantly. To make more efficient use of the space in the city, these types of houses were developed and built. Most of the houses originated between 1880 and 1930.

The origin of these houses is based on Roman houses, Pompeyan houses and traditional colonial urban livings from Rio de la Plata. These patio houses are centered around square patios and split in 2 “L” shapes houses with each owning half the patio.

They were built completely with stone bricks and to show the socio-economic status of the homeowner and family, the house façade possesses Italian style ornaments on the front street façade (fachadas) including columns, capitals, emblems together with high windows and high doors as house decoration.

Dimensions and layout 
The typical dimensions of these houses are based on the old city measurements that used varas. The colonial block of houses measured 150 varas and each house width was given 10 varas, that is 8.66 metres. The house length varies between 16 and 30 meters and dependent on the terrain (that could go up until half a block deep, around 50 meters), the house can have an additional back garden. Most of these houses are located with its short side to the street and its long side into the block of houses, so that multiple houses could be built next to each other. But some rare houses are built with the long side to the street and provides light from the street as well as from the internal patio.

The rooms measure 4x4 meters. As the rooms all have doors and windows above the doors to the internal patio to ventilate the roomspaces Also, the ceiling height that measures between 4–5 meters high helps further to accommodate the high summer heat as well the colder winter temperatures in Argentina. In addition, these livings also have floor ventilation space underneath the house. These ventilation spaces are connected through air vents that can be seen in the facade front wall below and above the windows.

The houses are rectangular shaped with all rooms interconnected, and the houses are entered from one of the short sides.  The layout is based on a “hierarchy of rooms”. The bathrooms, kitchen and dining room are furthest away from the entrance.  These rooms could be connected with a small patio. The next rooms are the children's room, grandparent's room, parents' room and a parents’ activities room. From the outside, the first area is the hallway, and through a door one you can enter the patio and the main social room. The closer and more intimate visitors are to the family, the deeper they get invited into the house.

One can either enter the rooms through the different doors in each of the rooms, or one can walk through the gallery in the patio, typically a part with a small roof to protect against the rain and sun.

Heritage and revival 
As these houses were built with bricks and have high quality to last, are well ventilated, provide large living space as well as the rise of popularity in heritage, these houses are becoming popular again.  Most of them continue as family houses and are modernized. In most cases the internal walls between the rooms are broken open to provide more space and garages and mezzanines are built to make better use of the height of the house. In some cases, the roofs are also converted in terraces to provide more open space.

In some neighborhoods such as Palermo and San Telmo, these houses are also converted in offices, doctor practices, lawyer offices, fashion boutique shops, bars, and even restaurants.

However, as the terrain prices rise, some owners sell their houses to be converted into high rise buildings. There are initiatives ongoing to protect this heritage.

References

External links
 Blueprint of a typical Casa Chorizo (Spanish) - Official Website of the Buenos Aires City
 Casa Chorizo, una vivienda de Buenos Aires bastante peculiar/Casa Chorizo, a very typical Buenos Aires type of housing (Spanish) - Website of ARQUITECTURA UBA
 CasaChorizo.net - Website about the architecture, heritage and modernization of the Casas Chorizo
 Description of a Casa Chorizo (Spanish) - Website of Arquitectura de Calle, writing about Architecture, Art, Heritage and Design 
 La 'Casa Chorizo', la vivienda típica de Buenos Aires de principios del siglo XX/Casa Chorizo, the typical housing of Buenos Aires from early 20th century (Spanish) - Website of Collegi d’Arquitectes de Catalunya
 Housing for the masses: casa chorizo - Website of  tour guide & guidebook author Robert Wright
 EL REVIVAL DE LA CASA CHORIZO/The revival of the Casa Chorizo (Spanish) - Website of INmendoza.com about culture, art and  entertainment in Mendoza
 Las fachadas de las Casas Chorizo - Photos of Casas Chorizo facades in Argentina and other countries including photo archive

House types
Architecture in Argentina